Pramogų arena formerly known as Vilnius Ice Palace is an arena in Vilnius, Lithuania.

The Arena was built in 2002.  There is a skating rink (sports, fine, speed, individual and mass skating possible), a cafe with 2 halls (50 seats in the first floor, 150 seats in the second floor; up to 200 guests during the buffet).  Hockey or curling can be played in the arena.  The arena holds about 2.5 thousand spectators during hockey competitions, concerts, or, if the stage is set at the end of the arena, 4 thousand spectators.  World-class star concerts take place in this arena.

External links
Official website

Indoor arenas in Lithuania
Sports venues in Vilnius
Indoor ice hockey venues in Lithuania